Schützenberger may refer to these people:
 Anne Ancelin Schützenberger (1919–2018)
 Paul Schützenberger, French chemist
 René Schützenberger, French painter
 Marcel-Paul "Marco" Schützenberger, French mathematician and Doctor of Medicine, known for
 Schutzenberger group
 Schützenberger theorem
 Chomsky–Schützenberger enumeration theorem
 Chomsky–Schützenberger representation theorem
 Chomsky–Schützenberger hierarchy

German-language surnames
French families
Alsatian-German people